Kevin Morgan (born 3 January 1948) is a former Australian cyclist. He competed in the individual road race and the team time trial events at the 1968 Summer Olympics.

Morgan set the fastest time in the amateur Goulburn to Sydney Classic in 1968 run in reverse direction from Milperra to Goulburn.

References

External links
 

1948 births
Living people
Australian male cyclists
Olympic cyclists of Australia
Cyclists at the 1968 Summer Olympics
Cyclists from Tasmania